Son of the Black Sword is a 2015 epic fantasy novel by Larry Correia and published by Baen Books. It is the first book in the Saga of the Forgotten Warrior series. It was followed by House of Assassins in 2019. It won Best Fantasy Novel at the 2016 Dragon Awards, was nominated for a 2015 AML Award and the 2016 Gemmell Legend Award. The novel also placed ninth in the 2016 Locus Award for Best Fantasy Novel readers' poll.

Reception
Publishers Weekly gave Son of the Black Sword a starred review, stating that it was "full of action, intrigue, and wry humor", calling the characters "complex" and "sympathetic". Nick Sharps at Elitist Book Reviews gave the novel five stars, praising its main character and saying "Ashok is the sort of protagonist to do Conan proud", and that it would "earn Larry a lot of new fans from the fantasy genre".

It won Best Fantasy Novel at the 2016 Dragon Awards, was a finalist for the 2015 AML Awards in the novel category, and nominated for the 2016 Gemmell Legend Award. The novel placed ninth in the 2016 Locus Poll Award results for Best Fantasy Novel.

References

2015 American novels
2015 fantasy novels
American fantasy novels
Baen Books books